Parliamentary elections were held in Iceland on 13 June 1971. Although the Independence Party remained the largest party in the Lower House of the Althing, winning 15 of the 40 seats, Independence Party leader Jóhann Hafstein resigned as Prime Minister the day after the elections as his party and its coalition partners had failed to win a majority of seats. Ólafur Jóhannesson of the Progressive Party succeeded him as Prime Minister, announcing the formation of a new coalition government on the same day. The new government's programme included expanding Icelandic fishing borders from 19 to 80 kilometers and gradually closing down Naval Air Station Keflavik but remaining committed to NATO membership.

Results

References

Iceland
Parliament
Elections in Iceland
Parliamentary elections in Iceland
Iceland